John W. Blackford (4 March 1837 – 10 April 1916) was an American politician.

Blackford was born near Dillsburg, Pennsylvania, as were his grandfather Joseph and father Aaron, on 4 March 1837. His family had lived in the area since Martin Blackford emigrated from Scotland in 1751. John Blackford's mother was of Dutch descent. He was educated in country schools and the York County Academy. Blackford subsequently taught school, then moved to Van Buren County, Iowa, in 1864. In Iowa, he raised Poland China pigs and Hereford cattle. Blackford served as president of the American Poland China Record Association from 1903 to 1904, and became treasurer of the organization thereafter. From 1906, he lived in Hillsboro, and was president of the Hillsboro Savings Bank. He served one term in the Iowa House of Representatives, as a Republican legislator for District 20, then located in Henry County, from 1913 to 1915. Blackford died on 10 April 1916 in Hillsboro. His son Aaron Vale Blackford later served in both houses of the Iowa General Assembly.

References

People from Dillsburg, Pennsylvania
1837 births
1916 deaths
People from Van Buren County, Iowa
Republican Party members of the Iowa House of Representatives
20th-century American politicians
People from Henry County, Iowa
Farmers from Iowa
American people of Scottish descent
American people of Dutch descent
American bank presidents
Schoolteachers from Pennsylvania
19th-century American educators